The northern lampreys (Petromyzontidae) are a family of lampreys. Northern lampreys have the highest number of chromosomes (164–174) among vertebrates.

Genera 
 Caspiomyzon
 Entosphenus
 Eudontomyzon
 Ichthyomyzon
 Lampetra
 Lethenteron
 Petromyzon
 Tetrapleurodon

References

External links 
 FishBase.org: Details for family Petromyzontidae – the Northern lampreys

Fish described in 1827
Fish families
Fish of Asia
Fish of Europe
Fish of North America
Fish of the Atlantic Ocean
Fish of the Pacific Ocean
.
Taxa named by Antoine Risso